Solomon David Sassoon (1915–1985) was an educator, Rabbi, philanthropist, fundraiser, and collector of Jewish manuscripts.

Biography

Early life
Solomon David Sassoon was born in August 1915 in London. He is a member of the wealthy Sassoon family. His father was David Solomon Sassoon (1880–1942), the renowned collector of Hebrew manuscripts from Baghdad. His paternal grandmother was Flora Sassoon. As a result, his paternal great-grandfather was Albert Abdullah David Sassoon (1818–1896), and his paternal great-great-grandfather was David Sassoon (1792–1864), a leading trader of cotton and opium who served as the treasurer of Baghdad between 1817 and 1829.

He was tutored in Talmud by Rabbi Eliyahu Eliezer Dessler.

Career
He made original contributions to linguistic analysis, philosophy, physiology and Biblical criticism. In 1953 and again in 1964, he declined requests to put his name forward as a candidate for the position of Sephardi Chief Rabbi of Israel. His varied interests and literary output were maintained until his death.

Death and legacy
Solomon David Sassoon built a library in Letchworth, England, to house his father's collections of Jewish manuscripts and incunabula. Some of these holdings were later auctioned by Sotheby's of London in Zurich and in New York, between the years 1975 - 1994, in order to satisfy the Sassoon estate's British tax obligations. Today, what remains of this priceless collection has been transferred to University of Toronto, in Canada. He died in May 1985. His son, Isaac S.D. Sassoon, is also a rabbi.

Bibliography
Reality Revisited: A New Look at Computers and Minds, Physics and Evolution, Feldheim; 2nd Revised edition (1991), 

''Natan Hokhma liShlomo: A Collection of Torah Commentary, Essays on the Talmud and Assorted Philosophical Writings (1989)

References

External links

English religious writers
Bibliophiles
Sassoon family
Sephardi rabbis
British Orthodox rabbis
1915 births
1985 deaths
British people of Indian-Jewish descent
Baghdadi Jews
British writers of Indian descent